George Robertson (14 October 1900 – 10 August 1976) was a British swimmer. He competed in three events at the 1920 Summer Olympics.

References

External links
 

1900 births
1976 deaths
British male swimmers
Olympic swimmers of Great Britain
Swimmers at the 1920 Summer Olympics
Place of birth missing